Turn the Lights On may refer to:
 Turn the Lights On (song), a 1999 song by Big Sugar
 Turn the Lights On (album), a 2015 album by Rico Love
 Turn the Lights On, a song by  Natalie Bassingthwaighte, from the album 1000 Stars